Lachie Gill is an Australian singer-songwriter. He won the  eleventh season of The Voice Australia on 29 May 2022. He received $100,000 and a record label deal with Universal Music Australia.

Career

2022: The Voice Australia

In 2022, Lachie auditioned for The Voice Australia. He performed "If the World Was Ending" in the blind auditions and got the four coaches, Keith Urban, Jess Mauboy, Rita Ora, and Guy Sebastian to turn for him. After Sebastian was blocked by Ora, he chose to be a part of Team Rita, where he won the show on 29 May 2022.

 denotes winner.

On 11 November 2022, Gill released "Sad Summer". About the release, Gill said "It was at a time when my relationship was going through a bit of a rough stage. I've written way too many sad songs, and I wanted to see if I could put that energy into something a bit more upbeat."

Personal life
Lachie resides in Melbourne, Victoria and works as a physical education teacher. He was formerly an AFL player.

Discography

Singles

References

Living people
Year of birth missing (living people)
The Voice (Australian TV series) contestants
The Voice (franchise) winners
Australian singer-songwriters